Yurtbeyli is a town in the District of Haymana, Ankara Province, Turkey.

Population 
The village is populated by the Kurdish Şêxbizin tribe.

References

Populated places in Ankara Province
Haymana, Ankara
Towns in Turkey

Kurdish settlements in Ankara Province